The Arab International University (AIU);  (previously: Arab European University) is a Syrian private university located in Ghabaghib, Daraa Governorate, Syria, founded in 2005. It was created under Presidential Decree No. 193 on the 06/05/2005.

Faculties 
 Faculty of Dentistry
 Department of Dentistry
 Department of basic and medical sciences.
 Department of histopathology and anatomy.
 Oral medicine department.
 Department of dental treatment.
 Dental implantation department.
 Department of periodontal diseases
 Oral rehabilitation department.
 Department of Orthodontics and paediatric dentistry.
 Department of Oral and Maxillofacial Surgery.

 Faculty of Pharmacy
 Faculty of Architecture
 Faculty of Civil Engineering
 Faculty of Informatics and Communication Engineering
 Department of Information Technology
 Department of Communications
 Department of Computer Science
 Faculty of Business Administration
 Department of Management
 Department of Marketing
 Department of Accounting
 Department of Finance and Banking
 Department of Information technology management
 Faculty of Fine Arts
 Department of Industrial Design
 Department of Fashion Design
 Department of Interior design
 Department of Visual Communication and Graphic Design
 Faculty of Law

References

Universities in Syria